{{Infobox game
| name = Vs. System
| subtitle = 
| image = File:Vs. System card back.jpg
| image_caption=VS System cardback design
| image_size = 200
| image_alt = 
| caption = Cover of X-Men vs. the Brotherhood,
one of the "Vs. System" titles published
| width = 200
| label_width = 
| other_names = 
| AKA = 
| manufacturer = 
| designer = Matt Hyra, Mike Hummel, Edward Fear, Danny Mandel
| illustrator = 
| actor = 
| voice_over = 
| publisher = Upper Deck
| date = 
| years = 
| genre = 
| language = 
| system = 
| players = 2 
| setup_time = < 5 minutes
| playing_time = < 30 minutes
| random_chance =
| ages = 
| skills = Card playingSimple mathDeck optimizationPlanningDeception
| materials = 
| media_type = 
| blank_label = 
| blank_data = 
| website = 
| footnotes =  Some casual rules allow more players.
}}
Vs. System (short for Versus System), also written as VS System and abbreviated as VS, is a collectible card game designed by Upper Deck Entertainment (UDE). In the game, players build and play a deck of Vs. System cards in an attempt to win a game against their opponent. It was first published in 2004 and is set in the superhero genre. The game was discontinued by Upper Deck Entertainment in January 2009.

UDE announced at the 2014 Gen Con Indianapolis that they would be letting convention-goers playtest a subset of Marvel Origins reprinted as "Vs. System Living Card Game". UDE then relaunched Vs. System at the 2015 Gen Con Indianapolis in its updated 2PCG format, switching from the traditional, partially-randomized card distribution model of most CCGs to a non-random, fixed-distribution model.

Superheroic setting

The sets of the Vs. System are based on the superheroic settings of Marvel and DC Comics, with the exception of a smaller set called the Hellboy Essential Collection. For the most part expansion sets alternated release between Marvel-based sets and DC Comics based sets with new sets every three to six months. All sets are interchangeable and compatible with each other and share the same card back. This allows players to mix characters fighting against or with each other.

Card art, characters, and gameplay concepts are inspired by their comic book appearances with the designers using what they describe as "top-down design", meaning they make every attempt to develop a character's card mechanics in keeping with how the character is represented in comic books.
Well known artists that have contributed card art include Alex Ross, John Van Fleet, Alex Garner, Jim Lee, Rachel Dodson, and Bill Sienkiewicz.

Gameplay

The Vs. System attempts to emulate epic superhero battles. Each player starts the game with 50 "endurance points". If a player has zero or negative endurance at the end of the Recovery Phase, he or she is knocked out of the game. The Vs. System Comprehensive Rules has an in-depth explanation of every aspect of the game and is official for use in tournament judging.

Types of cards

There are four types of cards in the Vs. System, with color-coded frames: Character (usually red, but black for "concealed" characters), Equipment (gray), Location (green), and Plot Twist (blue). All four types of cards share a common layout.

Phases of gameplay
Draw Phase: Each player simultaneously draws two cards from their deck.
Build Phase: Starting with the player holding the initiative, and going clockwise, each player completes the following steps:Resource Step: You may place one card face down into the resource row.Recruit Step: Spend resource points to recruit characters and/or equipment. Resource points are determined at the beginning of the Recruit step by how many cards a player has in his or her resource row.Formation Step: Rearrange your characters between your front and support rows.  You may also transfer "Transferable" equipment during this step.
After the player with the initiative completes their steps within the Build Phase, each other player completes theirs in turn. Once each player finishes, the Build Phase ends and the Combat Phase begins.
Combat Phase: Starting with the player holding the initiative, each player has an "Attack Step" where they may declare attacks with the characters they control against their opponent's characters, or directly against an opposing player if they don't control any non-stunned visible characters. The player with the initiative attacks with all legal attackers, or until they wish to pass. Repeat this Attack Step for each player, going clockwise, from the player with the initiative.  Once each person has completed their Attack Step, the Combat Phase ends and the Recovery Phase begins
Recovery Phase: At the end of the recovery phase, during the "wrap-up" portion, each player compares endurance totals, and all players with 0 or less endurance lose the game.  If this would leave no players still in the game, the player with the highest endurance total wins the game. Then all players may simultaneously recover one stunned character, KO all remaining stunned characters, and ready all objects (characters, locations, equipment) they control.  Once these steps are performed, the initiative passes clockwise to the next player, the Recovery Phase ends, and the next turn commences with the Draw Phase.

Variant rules
 Grand Melee: A regular game of Vs. System for any number of players. Last man standing wins.
 Team Alliance: A 2-on-2 game of Vs. System. Teammates sit across from each other. Plays just like grand melee, but teammates share an endurance total of 100 and cannot attack each other. Play until only one team is left.
 Two-Headed Mutant: A 2-on-2 game of Vs. System. Teammates sit next to each other across from their opponents. Each team begins the game with 100 endurance. This game variant can be played with any number of people on either team, as long as the teams are even numbered. 50 endurance is added onto the total endurance score for each person on a team. Therefore, a Three-Headed Mutant would see a game with 150 endurance.

Card sets
All cards are marked in the lower left with an expansion code or set code, a three-letter code identifying the set in which the card was published. The first letter of the set code indicates the setting (D for DC Comics and M for Marvel Comics), except for the Essential Collection set, which starts with the letter E.

Most Vs. System cards are released in expansion sets, of which there were a total of 18. The first 14 expansion sets all had either 165 or 220 cards, but starting with Marvel Legends, which had 273 cards, the size of expansion sets grew larger, peaking at 330 cards of the Marvel Universe set. Marvel Legends also debuted a card face layout redesign.

The game was also periodically supplemented by the release of starter deck sets, of which there were a total of 6. The starter deck sets each contained two playable 40 card mini-decks. They pitted two teams against each other, typically a "hero" team versus a "villain" team. The first 3 (X-Men vs. the Brotherhood, Spider-Man vs. Doc Ock, and Batman vs. the Joker) drew all their cards from other expansion sets. However, the last 3 (Batman, Fantastic Four, and X-Men) contained new cards not in expansions sets. Each of the last 3 starter sets also were published to coincide with an associated film also released that year (Batman Begins, Fantastic Four, and X-Men: The Last Stand, respectively). UDE had originally planned to release a 7th starter set, for Superman (to coincide with the 2006 Superman Returns movie), but that set ended up being cancelled and never released.

Additionally, UDE planned an Essential Collections line geared towards introducing characters from outside the Marvel and DC Universes. However, only one such set ever ended up being released, the Hellboy Essential Collection. It contained two pre-constructed 60-card decks, a comprehensive rule book, and a number of other extras. Like the starter decks, the Hellboy Essential Collection is tournament-legal.

UDE also planned a Giant-Size line. However, the only set ever published in the line was The Coming of Galactus, a set geared toward multiplayer play in which multiple players would be pitted against a single powerful player taking on the role of Galactus. All cards in the set were legal for tournament play, with the exception of an oversized Galactus card and "Planet" cards.

Finally, there were exclusive sets, consisting of promotional cards associated with a particular expansion set released through venues such as conventions and tournaments. The exclusives sets are listed here rather than in the table below. The 5 exclusive sets (with set codes in parentheses) were:
 associated with Marvel Legends: Age of Apocalypse (MAA) and Marvel Exclusives (MEX)
 associated with DC Legends: DC Exclusives (DCX)
 associated with Marvel Universe: Marvel Equipment (MEQ) and Marvel Ultimates (MUL)

The following table lists all non-exclusive sets in chronological order of release:

Organized Play

In tournament play, there are three common formats:
 Modern Age format draws a card pool from the last two released sets from both brands (i.e., the last two Marvel sets and the last two DC Comics sets).
 Silver Age format draws a card pool from the last four released sets from both brands (i.e, the last four released sets from Marvel Comics and the last four released sets from DC Comics).
 Golden Age format draws from a card pool of all legally playable cards.

Upper Deck Entertainment planned the year-round professional $1 million Organized Play Pro Circuit prior to the release of the game.

Notable players in UDE Organized Play
The following is a listing of players who have won more than one 10K event or have won a Pro Circuit event.

 William Hodack, 2004 Origins $10K Champion, June 26, 2004
 Marshall James, 2004 Philadelphia $10k Champion, July 10, 2004
 Jeremy Tucker, 2004 $10K Champion, Wizard World Chicago
 Brian Kibler, first-ever Pro Circuit Champion, Gen Con Indy, August 22, 2004
 Robert Leander, $10K Wizard World Texas Champion, November 6, 2004, $10K New Jersey Champion, January 15, 2005; first Vs. System player to win multiple $10K events
 Ryan Jones, Pro Circuit Los Angeles Champion, December 3, 2004
 Hans Joachim Höh (Hans served a 3-year ban for cheating in the top 8 of a Pro Circuit), $10K Hannover Champion, February 5, 2005, $10K Bologna Champion, February 20, 2005, $10K Bremen Champion, December 3, 2005 
 Dean Sohlne, $10K London Champion, March 21, 2005, $10K Amsterdam Champion, April 9, 2005.
 Michael Jacob, $10K Chicago Champion, April 2, 2005, $10K Toronto Champion, August 27, 2005, $10K Orlando Champion, October 15, 2005
 Ian Vincent, Pro Circuit San Francisco Champion
 Trey Kelly, Pro Circuit New York Champion
 Anthony Calabrese, Pro Circuit Indianapolis 2006 Champion
 Adam Horvath, Pro Circuit Amsterdam Champion, April 7, 2005
 Adam Bernstein, Pro Circuit New York Champion, May 26, 2005
 Adam Prosak, $10K San Diego Champion, July 15, 2005, $10K Atlanta Champion, September 4, 2005 Pro Circuit Los Angeles November 17, 2006
 Kakarot Turker, $10K Sydney Champion, December 1, 2006, 6 consecutive 10K top 8s
 Darryn Ying, $10K Melbourne Champion, October 20, 2006,
 Vidianto Wijaya, Pro Circuit Atlanta Champion, March 24, 2006; as of August 13, 2006, has a record five Pro Circuit top eight finishes and has won over $100,000
 Kyle Dembinski, Pro Circuit Sydney 2007 winner
 John Hammond, $10K Indy 2007 Champion - Bring Your Own Set format 
 Brian Eugenio, 1st Vs. Worlds Champion 2008
 Robert Rietze, Gen Con Indy 2008 1st Place
 Alexander Antonias, Brisbane and Adelaide 10k champion

Banned list
As with most TCGs, the ever-increasing card pool leads to more and more combinations and possibilities. While this is generally considered to be a positive factor, sometimes these combinations bring a degeneracy that is unhealthy for tournament play and the long term health of the game. When this occurs, organized play intervenes and the offending cards are usually banned. The first card to be banned was "Overload" banned because of its synergy with various attackpumps. Used in tandem, players were able to stun their opponent's board at minimal cost. UDE later released a fixed—playable but unremarkable—version of the card called System Failure, released in MAV.

Unlike most CCGs which have banned lists unique to various formats, UDE has chosen to have one universal all-encompassing banned list.

Video game
A video game based on the Vs. System was released on February 27, 2007 for the PC, PSP and Nintendo DS. It was developed by Vicious Cycle Software and published by Konami. The game has been named as the Marvel Trading Card game and only includes cards from Marvel Origins and Marvel-based expansions up to the Avengers set.

Awards
In 2004, Vs. System won the Gamers' Choice Award and was also nominated for Best Collectible Card Game or Expansion both from Origins Awards. In 2005 it received the Game of the Year award from InQuest Gamer.

ReviewsPyramid''

References

Further reading

External links
 VS System Fan Forum (VSSystem.org)
 VS System Card of the Day - Over 500 Card Reviews (Pojo.com)
 VS TCGplayer Magazine
 VS System Fan Forum (Pojo.biz)
 ccgdb.com card engine: vs system A search engine for Vs cards.

Card games introduced in 2004
Collectible card games based on comics
Origins Award winners
Collectible card games based on Marvel Comics
Upper Deck Company games
DC Comics games